Patrick Sibomana (born 15 October 1996) is a Rwandan professional footballer who plays as a midfielder for Police.

Career

International goals
Scores and results list Rwanda's goal tally first.

References

External links 
 
 Patrick Sibomana at Footballdatabase

1996 births
Living people
Rwandan footballers
Association football midfielders
Rwanda international footballers
Isonga F.C. players
APR F.C. players
FC Shakhtyor Soligorsk players
Young Africans S.C. players
Police F.C. (Rwanda) players
People from Kigali
Rwanda under-20 international footballers
Rwanda youth international footballers
Rwandan expatriate footballers
Expatriate footballers in Belarus
Rwandan expatriate sportspeople in Belarus
Expatriate footballers in Tanzania
Rwandan expatriate sportspeople in Tanzania
Tanzanian Premier League players